Callaly is a village and civil parish in Northumberland, England. It is on the line of the Roman road linking the Roman forts of High Rochester to the west and Learchild to the east, where it joins the Devil's Causeway Roman road to the north. The parish includes the hamlets of Lorbottle and Yetlington.

Governance 
Callaly is in the parliamentary constituency of Berwick-upon-Tweed. The parish of "Callaly" was formed on 1 April 1955 from Callaly and Yetlington and "Lorbottle".

Landmarks 

Callaly Castle, a Grade 1 listed building, is located just north of the village.

Dancing Hall is located outside of Callaly village.

References

External links

 Images of Callaly Castles, Old and New

Villages in Northumberland
Civil parishes in Northumberland